The 1903 Army Cadets football team represented the United States Military Academy in the 1903 college football season. In their first and only season under head coach Edward Leonard King, the Cadets compiled a  record, shut out five of their nine opponents (including a scoreless tie with Colgate), and outscored all opponents by a combined total 

The team's two losses were to Harvard (5–0) and Yale (17–5). In an intersectional game, the Cadets defeated Chicago  In the annual Army–Navy Game, the Cadets, behind quarterback Horatio B. Hackett, defeated the Midshipmen 

Three members of the squad were honored by one or both of Walter Camp (WC) and Caspar Whitney (CW) on the All-America team. They are: guard Napoleon Riley (WC-2); halfback Edward Farnsworth (CW-2); and fullback Frederick Prince (CW-2).

Schedule

References

Army
Army Black Knights football seasons
Army Cadets football